Nickel-O-Zone was a one-hour programming block on the American cable television network Nickelodeon, geared toward older (preteen to teen) audiences, that ran from August 31, 1998 – 2000. It was aired on Sunday-Friday 8p and ended at 9p. ET.

Nickel-O-Zone line-ups
The following in the section below are the shows aired during Nickel-O-Zone for the year listed. Although these are the standard shows aired, some days would see variation in the Nickel-O-Zone line-up.

Programming
This is a list of all programming on Nickel-O-Zone and their time slots that were aired around August 31, 1998 - 2000.

1998-1999
Sundays
 8 p.m. The Mystery Files of Shelby Woo
 8:30 p.m. Nick News
Mondays
 8 p.m. Hey Arnold!
 8:30 p.m. The Journey of Allen Strange
Tuesdays
 8 p.m. The Wild Thornberrys
 8:30 p.m. Cousin Skeeter
Wednesdays
 8 p.m. Hey Arnold!
 8:30 p.m. The Journey of Allen Strange
Thursdays
 8 p.m. The Wild Thornberrys
 8:30 p.m. Cousin Skeeter
Fridays
8 p.m. KaBlam!
 8:30 p.m. Animorphs

Early to Spring 1999
Sundays
 8 p.m. Animorphs
 8:30 p.m. Nick News
Mondays
 8 p.m. Hey Arnold!
 8:30 p.m. CatDog
Tuesdays
 8 p.m. The Wild Thornberrys
 8:30 p.m. CatDog
Wednesdays
 8 p.m. Hey Arnold!
 8:30 p.m. CatDog
Thursdays
 8 p.m. The Wild Thornberrys
 8:30 p.m. CatDog
Fridays
8 p.m. KaBlam!
 8:30 p.m. CatDog

Spring to Summer 1999
Sundays
 8 p.m. Animorphs
 8:30 p.m. Nick News
Mondays
 8 p.m. Hey Arnold!
 8:30 p.m. Hey Arnold!
Tuesdays
 8 p.m. The Wild Thornberrys
 8:30 p.m. The Wild Thornberrys
Wednesdays
 8 p.m. Hey Arnold!
 8:30 p.m. Hey Arnold!
Thursdays
 8 p.m. The Wild Thornberrys
 8:30 p.m. The Wild Thornberrys
Fridays
8 p.m. Cousin Skeeter
 8:30 p.m. Cousin Skeeter

Summer 1999
Sundays
 8 p.m. Animorphs
 8:30 p.m. Nick News
Mondays
 8 p.m. Hey Arnold!
 8:30 p.m. CatDog
Tuesdays
 8 p.m. The Wild Thornberrys
 8:30 p.m. Cousin Skeeter
Wednesdays
 8 p.m. Hey Arnold!
 8:30 p.m. The Journey of Allen Strange
Thursdays
 8 p.m. The Wild Thornberrys
 8:30 p.m. Cousin Skeeter
Fridays
8 p.m. KaBlam!
 8:30 p.m. Oh Yeah! Cartoons

Summer to Fall 1999

Sundays
 8 p.m. Animorphs
 8:30 p.m. Nick News
Mondays
 8 p.m. The Wild Thornberrys
 8:30 p.m. Rocket Power
Tuesdays
 8 p.m. The Wild Thornberrys
 8:30 p.m. Cousin Skeeter
Wednesdays
 8 p.m. The Wild Thornberrys
 8:30 p.m. Rocket Power
Thursdays
 8 p.m. The Wild Thornberrys
 8:30 p.m. Cousin Skeeter
Fridays
8 p.m. SpongeBob SquarePants
 8:30 p.m. CatDog

Smell-O-Vision

Mondays
 8 p.m. The Wild Thornberrys: Show Me the Bunny 
 8:30 p.m. Rocket Power: D" is for Dad / Banned on the Run
Tuesdays
 8 p.m. The Wild Thornberrys: Reef Grief
 8:30 p.m. Cousin Skeeter: N/A
Wednesdays
 8 p.m. The Wild Thornberrys: Thornberry Island
 8:30 p.m. Rocket Power: Super McVarial 900 / Loss of Squid
Thursdays
 8 p.m. The Wild Thornberrys: Clash of the Teutons
 8:30 p.m. Cousin Skeeter: Unchained
Fridays
8 p.m. SpongeBob SquarePants: Sandy's Rocket / Squeaky Boots (Premiere)
 8:30 p.m. CatDog : Send In The CatDog / Fishing for Trouble / Fetch

Nickel-AAAHH!!-Zone

Mondays
 8 p.m. The Wild Thornberrys: Blood Sisters
 8:30 p.m. Rocket Power: Fall and Rise of Sam / Typhoid Sam
Tuesdays
 8 p.m. CatDog: CatDogula
 8:30 p.m. 100 Deeds for Eddie McDowd: All Howls Eve
Wednesdays
 8 p.m. Hey Arnold!: Arnold's Halloween
 8:30 p.m. Kenan & Kel: Oh, Brother
Thursdays
 8 p.m. SpongeBob SquarePants: Scaredy Pants / I Was a Teenage Gary
 8:30 p.m. Cousin Skeeter

Nickelodeon